Landesrat is a German language designation of offices or institutions in government or administration

 In Austria: a member of the Landesregierung government in one of the States of Austria
 A similar office in the Politics of Trentino-Alto Adige/Südtirol
 An officer appointed by Landschaftsversammlung to the Landschaftsverbände in North Rhine-Westphalia
 The parliament of the Saar (League of Nations) (1922–1935)
 An institution in a state-level subdivision of the German party Die Linke
 In former Prussia: the highest level of administrators of the Provinzialverwaltung, elected by Provinziallandtag, reporting to the Landeshauptmann

See also
 :de:Landrat, a disambiguation page in German Wikipedia
 Landtag